Hong Kong has entered into several surrender of fugitive offenders agreements with foreign states. The term surrender of fugitive offenders agreement is used in place of extradition treaty to signify Hong Kong's non-sovereign status. As a special administrative region of the People's Republic of China since July 1997, Hong Kong is authorised by the Central Government of China to enter into such agreements, according to Article 96 of the Basic Law. The legality of one such agreement was challenged in the US state of Connecticut, but the US Court of Appeals for the Second Circuit ruled that the agreement entered into between Hong Kong and the US should be regarded as a 'treaty' under US law.

Article 2(1)(a) of Fugitive Offenders Ordinance (Cap. 503) allows the Hong Kong government to conclude arrangements of surrender of fugitive offenders with 'a place outside Hong Kong (other than any other part of the People's Republic of China)'. In 2019, the Carrie Lam administration proposed an amendment bill to enable Hong Kong to enter into 'special surrender arrangements' with 'a place outside Hong Kong', including other parts of the People's Republic of China. Oppositions to the bill evolved to a series of wide-range protests and the bill was withdrawn.

On 30 June 2020, the Standing Committee of the National People's Congress in Beijing enacted a national security law to be imposed in Hong Kong. Several countries have since suspended the agreements with Hong Kong. In response, China and Hong Kong (on the central government's instruction) announced the suspension of Hong Kong's extradition treaties with Canada, Australia, the United Kingdom, New Zealand, Germany and the United States, as well as the shelving of a pending treaty with France, along with the suspension of some bilateral mutual legal assistance agreements.

List of Hong Kong surrender of fugitive offenders agreements

^: Never in force; ratification of agreement halted

See also 
Law of Hong Kong

References 

 List of Surrender of Fugitive Offenders Agreements, Department of Justice, Government of Hong Kong

Surrender of fugitive offenders agreements
Hong Kong